Ludeña is a surname most commonly used in Peru. Notable people with the surname include:

Antonio Ludeña (1740-1810), Spanish mathematician
Oscar Ludeña (born 1946), Peruvian boxer
Pedro Pablo Nakada Ludeña (born 1973), Peruvian serial killer

Surnames of Peruvian origin